Tanner was a 1990s American rock band from San Diego, California, formed after the breakup of Fishwife. They recorded for Caroline Records and Headhunter Records.

Critical reception
In an early live review, the Fort Worth Star-Telegram thought that Tanner "ravages too much from geeky-noise bands Pitchblende and Truman's Water - minus the diversity."

AllMusic, in a 4.5-star (out of 5) review, deemed Ill Gotten Gains "a grinding set of modern-day punk." Trouser Press called the debut "impressive," writing that "rather than write verse-chorus-verse punk, the trio piles riffs together — sort of a 'hey, this would sound great after that' style — and the almost effortless march through complex changeups is engaging, quirky and cool." Tucson Weekly wrote that "the band sticks to what it knows: straight ahead punk, with quick tempo shifts that don't attempt too much fanciness, and minus any trendy dissonant tangents." The San Diego Union-Tribune thought that "Tanner effectively ridicules suburban insularity, confusion and fear in 'Guard Dog', one of the best songs on the album."

Band members
Gar Wood - guitar, lead vocals
 Matt Ohlin - bass
 Chris Prescott - drums

Discography
Ill Gotten Gains - (Caroline Records, 1995)
(Germo) Phobic - (Headhunter Records, 1997)

References

External links
Official website

Punk rock groups from California
American post-hardcore musical groups
Musical groups from San Diego
Caroline Records artists